Michael "Mikel" Hennet Sotomayor (born 20 January 1983) is a member of the boyband D'NASH. He is known simply as Mikel and is the romantic of the band, as well as the child of the group. Mikel studied audio-visual communications in the United Kingdom. He has experience as a model and salsa dancer.

D'Nash 

In 2006 Michael formed a band named D'Nash with friends Esteban Piñero Camacho, Francisco Javier Álvarez Colinet and Antonio Martos Ortiz. They are the first Spanish boy band ever.

In 2008, it was announced that Antonio Martos Ortiz would be pursuing a career in theatre. The three remaining members continued until the band broke up in 2013, following poor sales of a new album.

Discography

Studio albums
 2006: Capaz de Todo
 2007–2008: Todo Va a Cambiar
 2013: Garabatos

External links 

 Official D'Nash Fan Website 

1983 births
Living people
People from Puerto de la Cruz
Eurovision Song Contest entrants for Spain
Eurovision Song Contest entrants of 2007
21st-century Spanish singers
21st-century Spanish male singers